Golestan-e Sofla (also Romanized as Golestān-e Soflá; also known as Qāţer Gūtūran-e Soflá and Qāţer Gūtran-e Soflá) is a village in Sarajuy-ye Sharqi Rural District, Saraju District, Maragheh County, East Azerbaijan Province, Iran. At the 2006 census, its population was 730, in 163 families.

References 

Towns and villages in Maragheh County